The Mrs. Richard Polson House located on Route 2 near Spooner, Wisconsin, United States, was built in 1917.  It was designed by Prairie School architects Purcell & Elmslie in Beaux Arts style.  It was built as a wedding gift from Mrs. Richard Polson for her son D. B. Brockett.  It was listed on the National Register of Historic Places in 1984.

References

Beaux-Arts architecture in Wisconsin
Houses in Washburn County, Wisconsin
Houses completed in 1917
Houses on the National Register of Historic Places in Wisconsin
National Register of Historic Places in Washburn County, Wisconsin